Araz-Naxçıvan PFK is an Azerbaijani football club based in Nakchivan.

The club played in the Azerbaijan Premier League again in 2014–15 after being promoted at the end of the 2013–14 season. The club plays in the Azerbaijan First Division from 2022 to 2023 season.

History 
The club was created in 1967 and as of 1968, it participated in Soviet First League. The club stopped its activity after collapse of Soviet Union. In 2001, the team was formed again and took part in the Azerbaijan Premier League. However year later, due to financial difficulties the team again ceased to exist.

The club was re-established on 23 May 2013 and immediately joined Azerbaijan First Division. In its first season, Araz sent Simurq crashing out of the Azerbaijan Cup. In May 2014, the club earned promotion to Azerbaijan Premier League after winning the division in same season. In September 2014, Araz became linked to a match fixing scandal, the result of which saw the key players leaving the club and Nakhchivan Autonomous Republic government officials intervening.

On 3 November 2014, Araz-Naxçıvan announced their withdrawal from the league due constant biased referee decisions, with the officially announcing their withdrawal on 17 November 2014.

Stadium 

Araz's home ground was Nakhchivan City Stadium, which has a capacity of 12,000. For the stadium's first game, the announced attendance was 4,000.

League and domestic cup history

Supporters 
Supporters of Araz were drawn from all over the Nakhchivan Autonomous Republic and beyond Azerbaijan. The club's main two supporting groups were Ultra Araz and Nagshijahan.

Notable managers 
''Information correct as of match played 2 November 2014. Only competitive matches are counted.

Notes:
P – Total of played matches
W – Won matches
D – Drawn matches
L – Lost matches
GS – Goal scored
GA – Goals against
%W – Percentage of matches won

Nationality is indicated by the corresponding FIFA country code(s).

Honours 
Azerbaijan First Division
 Winners (1): 2013–14

References

External links 
 Official Website 
 PFL

 
Football clubs in Azerbaijan
1967 establishments in Azerbaijan
Association football clubs established in 1967